Elaeagnus latifolia, known as the bastard oleaster, or soh-sang, is a species of Elaeagnus native to India and Southeast Asia.

Description
Elaeagnus latifolia is an evergreen shrub that can grow up to ten feet tall. It has alternate pinnately compound leaves. The plant gives off a bright red and speckled berry around the size of a grape or ~0.75 cm in diameter. The ripe fruit is pulpy with a sweet and slightly sour taste.

Ecology 
E. latifolia is widely distributed from Southeastern Asia to the slopes of the Himalayas. They inhabit dense swamps at about 1,500 feet above sea level in the Himalayas as well as dwelling in vast forest openings in Nepal.  It is suitable for growing in moist soil with any pH value and can also adapt to growing in regions where the soil is dry. Since E. latifolia can thrive in both moist and dry conditions, it can tolerate the most intense droughts. E. latifolia shares a symbiotic relationship with soil-dwelling bacteria that perform nitrogen fixation. The fruit is considered "unusual" because the fruit contains several "good" fatty acids, and was investigated for possible use against cancer.

Cultivation
The cultivation of Elaeagnus latifolia is mostly done in well drained soils. E. latifolia prefers soil that is moderately fertile which causes it to succeed in poor soils and dry soils. E. latifolia requires to grow in a position where there is plenty of sunlight. Outside of the native regions, E. latifolia is also cultivated in United Kingdom, however it is unlikely to succeed outdoors in the milder areas of the country. E. latifolia is known to be resistant to honey fungus, and it can also grow with orchards which increases yield from the fruit trees.

References

latifolia
Taxa named by Carl Linnaeus
Plants described in 1753
Flora of the Indian subcontinent
Flora of Indo-China